The Economic League was a German political party in South West Africa.

History
The party was established shortly before the 1934 elections by German members of the Legislative Assembly who had walked out of the Assembly when the South West African branch of the Nazi Party and Hitler Youth had been banned and their leaders deported.

The elections saw the Economic League nominate four candidates for the 12 elected seats. Although it received almost 20% of the vote overall, it won only one seat, Okahandja. The party did not contest any further elections.

References

Defunct political parties in Namibia
German diaspora political parties
Political parties established in 1934
1934 establishments in South West Africa